The 2008 Vancouver municipal election was held on November 15, 2008, filling seats on the Vancouver School Board, the Park Board, the Vancouver City Council, and the position of Mayor of Vancouver. It was held at the same time as municipal elections throughout the province. Three major civic parties were represented: the Coalition of Progressive Electors, the Non-Partisan Association, and Vision Vancouver. The Green Party of Vancouver fielded one candidate for Park Board commissioner.

Candidates and results
All incumbents are marked with (I) before their names.

Mayor
One mayor was elected out of 15 candidates. Of the candidates, four were affiliated with a political party, and eleven were independent. Gregor Robertson of Vision Vancouver was elected.

City councillors
Ten councillors were elected out of 32 candidates. Of the candidates, 24 were affiliated with a political party, and eight were independent. Eight incumbent councillors were seeking re-election: four from Vision Vancouver, three from the NPA, and one from COPE. Of the elected councillors, seven were from Vision Vancouver, two from COPE and one from the NPA.

Park Board commissioners
Seven commissioners were elected out of twenty candidates. Of the candidates, 15 were affiliated with a political party, and five were independent. Two incumbent commissioners were seeking re-election: one from COPE and one from the NPA. Of the elected commissioners, four were from Vision Vancouver, with one each from the NPA, COPE, and the Green Party of Vancouver.

School Board trustees
Nine school trustees were elected out of 19 candidates. Of the candidates, 17 were affiliated with a political party, and two were independent. Five incumbent trustees were seeking re-election: three from the NPA and two from COPE. Of the elected trustees, four were from Vision Vancouver, three from COPE and two from NPA.

Capital Plan questions
The following Capital Plan questions were posed to voters:

Public works
1. Are you in favour of Council having the authority, without further assent of the electors, to pass by-laws between January 1, 2009, and December 31, 2011, to borrow an aggregate $93,820,000 for the following purposes? 
Street and Bridge Infrastructure at $66,607,000
Traffic and Safety Improvements at $12,553,000
Street Lighting, Traffic Signal, and Communications Systems at $14,660,000

Public safety and civic facilities
2. Are you in favour of Council having the authority, without further assent of the electors, to pass by-laws between January 1, 2009, and December 31, 2011, to borrow an aggregate $68,605,000 for the following purposes?
Public Safety at $31,965,000
Civic Facilities at $32,490,000
Library at $4,150,000

Parks and recreation facilities
3. Are you in favour of Council having the authority, without further assent of the electors, to pass by-laws between January 1, 2009, and December 31, 2011, to borrow an aggregate $59,575,000 for the following purposes?
Recreation Facilities at $52,247,000
Parks at $7,328,000

Voter and party statistics

Voter turnout
Of the 403,663 registered voters, there were 124,285 recorded ballots, marking the voter turnout at 30.79%. This is an decrease of 1.66% from the 32.45% turnout during the previous municipal election in 2005.

Elected percentage by party

Seat changes by party

References

General

Specific

External links
 City of Vancouver Election Candidate Profiles
 City of Vancouver Election Page
 Daily Press Coverage of Vancouver Civic Election
 Various News
 Our Campaigns
 Politics1 Canada (beta)
 Canadian Politics
 Radical Press
 Nowpolling.ca

2008
2008 elections in Canada
2008 in British Columbia